Reggie Gene Willits (born May 30, 1981) is an American former professional baseball outfielder and associate head baseball coach for the Oklahoma Sooners. He played in Major League Baseball (MLB) for the Los Angeles Angels of Anaheim from 2006 through 2011, and was the first base coach for the New York Yankees from 2018 through 2021.

Early life
Reggie is the son of Gene and Judy Willits of Fort Cobb, Oklahoma. He attended junior high and high school at Fort Cobb-Broxton.  He attended Seminole State College in Seminole, Oklahoma, and transferred to the University of Oklahoma, where he played for the Oklahoma Sooners.

Playing career
The Los Angeles Angels of Anaheim selected Willits in the seventh round, with the 210th overall selection, of the 2003 Major League Baseball draft. Willits made his Major League Baseball debut with the Angels on April 26, 2006. He made the Angels' Opening Day roster in 2007.

On August 17, 2011, he was designated for assignment by the Angels after five seasons in Anaheim. After the 2011 season, he elected for free agency.

Coaching career
In 2013, Willits became the head baseball coach for Binger-Oney High School. Willits joined the New York Yankees' organization in 2015 as their outfield and baserunning coordinator. He was promoted to first base coach for the 2018 season.

After the 2021 season, Willits accepted a volunteer coaching assistant position with the Oklahoma Sooners.

Personal life
Willits married Amber Klugh of Fort Cobb; they met while in the sixth grade and married while attending the University of Oklahoma. they have three children, Jaxon, Hunter and Eli. Reggie has an older sister Wendi Willits Wells, who played basketball at Arkansas and for the Los Angeles Sparks of the WNBA. She's been head girls' basketball coach at Shawnee Oklahoma High School since 2008-09. Her teams have reached the state tournament the last four years and won the 5A championship in 2011-12.

Willits and his wife began building a home in 2003 in Fort Cobb, with the first completed structure a standalone 60-by-35 foot batting cage. Willits decided to save money and work on his game by moving the family into the batting cage, outfitted with an open plan. In 2007, the home was completed. Reggie was named after Reggie Jackson.

References

External links

1981 births
Living people
People from Chickasha, Oklahoma
Baseball coaches from Oklahoma
Baseball players from Oklahoma
Major League Baseball outfielders
Major League Baseball first base coaches
Los Angeles Angels players
New York Yankees coaches
Seminole State Trojans baseball players
Oklahoma Sooners baseball players
Provo Angels players
Arkansas Travelers players
Rancho Cucamonga Quakes players
Salt Lake Bees players
Inland Empire 66ers of San Bernardino players
Minor league baseball coaches
Oklahoma Sooners baseball coaches